The poplar kitten (Furcula bifida) is a species of moth in the family Notodontidae. The species was first described by Nikolaus Joseph Brahm in 1787. They are found throughout Europe and in North Africa, Mongolia, Kazakhstan and Xinjiang.

Description
The forewings are grey, with a broad, dark grey central band and a cloud of the same colour towards the tips of the wings. The band is inwardly margined by an almost straight black line, and outwardly by a curved line; the third line is double, and curved towards the costa, forming the inner edge of the grey cloud, the lower part is wavy. The first black line is inwardly, and the second outwardly edged with ochreous, and preceding the first is a series of black dots. The hindwings are also white with brown dots along the margin. The wingspan is 44–48 mm. It differs from Furcula furcula in its generally larger size, but more especially in the shape of the black line forming the outer margin of the central band; this forms a clean curve whereas, in the alder kitten it is always more or less angled or dentate towards the front margin of the wings.

It flies at night from May to July and is attracted to light, the male more so than the female. The larva is like a small version of the bizarre-looking larva of the puss moth, with the last pair of prolegs modified into two long "tails". It feeds on poplar and aspen, and occasionally on willow.

The species overwinters as a pupa in a cocoon on the trunk of its food plant.

Subspecies
F. b. bifida (Brahm, 1787)
F. b. lype (Seiffers, 1933)
F. b. urocera Boisduval, 1840

Gallery

Notes
The flight season refers to the British Isles. This may vary in other parts of the range.

References

Further reading
South R. (1907) The Moths of the British Isles, (First Series), Frederick Warne & Co. Ltd., London & NY: 359 pp. online

External links

 Taxonomy
Lepiforum e.V.

Notodontidae
Moths described in 1787
Moths of Europe
Moths of Asia
Taxa named by Nikolaus Joseph Brahm